Tom (Tiger Tom) Baldwin (March 14, 1947 – August 19, 2004) was a NASCAR Modified race driver. He competed for 40 seasons, winning 6 modified races as well as numerous other races. His 11 wins at Riverhead Raceway spanned from June 30, 1978 to June 6, 1992. He was given the "Most Popular Driver" award on the Modified tour for 2003. He died in an accident on lap 10 of the New England Dodge Dealers 150 at the Thompson International Speedway on August 19, 2004. He spun into the infield to miss another competitor's car and struck a concrete block protecting a light pole driver's side first.

He had a daughter, Tammy, and a son, Tommy Baldwin Jr., who was a crew chief and is now a car owner in the NASCAR Cup Series.

A memorial golf outing and a 77-lap memorial race (at Riverhead Raceway) are run in his honor Tommy Baldwin Racing (run by his son) also switched when available to No. 7 (with a "7NY" design) to honor his father.

Motorsports career results

NASCAR
(key) (Bold – Pole position awarded by qualifying time. Italics – Pole position earned by points standings or practice time. * – Most laps led.)

Winston Cup Series

Craftsman Truck Series

References

External links
 
 
Memorial tribute
Comments by son on his death

1947 births
2004 deaths
People from East Patchogue, New York
Sportspeople from Suffolk County, New York
Racing drivers from New York (state)
NASCAR drivers
24 Hours of Daytona drivers
Racing drivers who died while racing
Sports deaths in Connecticut